Eurimyia stipata (Walker, 1849), the long-nosed swamp fly, is a very common species of syrphid fly observed across northern North America. Syrphid flies are also known as Hover Flies or Flower Flies because the adults are frequently found hovering  around flowers from which they feed on nectar and pollen. Larvae of this genus are aquatic.

References

Hoverflies
Eristalinae
Diptera of North America
Insects described in 1849